Emrecan Afacanoğlu (born 15 March 1991) is a Turkish professional footballer. He plays as a centre back for Bergama Belediyespor.

Life and career
Afacanoğlu began his career with Bucaspor in 2007. He made his professional debut against Fethiyespor in a TFF Second League match on 9 November 2008.

References

External links

1991 births
Living people
People from Konak
Turkish footballers
Turkey youth international footballers
Bucaspor footballers
Boluspor footballers
Pazarspor footballers
TFF First League players
TFF Second League players
Association football defenders
Footballers from İzmir